Fetinino is a rural locality (a village) in Yurovskoye Rural Settlement, Gryazovetsky District, Vologda Oblast, Russia. The population was 17 as of 2002.

Geography 
Fetinino is located 33 km southwest of Gryazovets (the district's administrative centre) by road. Plyushchevo is the nearest rural locality.

References 

Rural localities in Gryazovetsky District